George Bain (1892-1948) was an Australian rugby league footballer who played in the 1910s and 1920s.

Background
Bain was born at Leichhardt, New South Wales in 1892.

Playing career
Bain went on to have a long career in the NSWRFL. He started his career at Annandale in 1912 for one season. He then switched to Newtown for eight seasons between 1913-1920. During this period he represented New South Wales on one occasions in 1914. Bain finished his career at Glebe in 1921.

Bain died on 3 May 1948, aged 56.

References

1892 births
1948 deaths
Annandale rugby league players
Newtown Jets players
Glebe rugby league players
New South Wales rugby league team players
Australian rugby league players
Rugby league centres
Rugby league players from Sydney